Cotoneaster acutifolius, the Peking cotoneaster, is a species of flowering plant in the family Rosaceae. It is native to southern Siberia, Mongolia, and most of China, and it has been introduced to Canada, the northern United States, and northern Europe. Some authorities consider Cotoneaster lucidus, the shiny cotoneaster, to be a synonym of Cotoneaster acutifolius.

References

acutifolius
Flora of Siberia
Flora of Mongolia
Flora of China
Plants described in 1832